Barclays Bank plc v Quincecare Ltd [1992] 4 All ER 363 is a judicial decision of High Court of Justice of England and Wales in relation to the banker-customer relationship, and in particular in connection with the bank's duties in relation to payment instructions which give rise, or ought to give rise, to a suspicion of fraud.

Although the decision is cited most frequently in relation to the potential liability of a bank to their customer, in the case itself the bank was a claimant, and the customer and its guarantor were seeking to defend their own liability on the basis of the bank's breach of duty.

The decision attracted much comment, and the duty of banks outlined in the decision has come to be referred to as the Quincecare duty.

Although the case was decided in February 1988, it was not subsequently reported in any of the major law reports until 1992, and even then it was reported solely in the All England Law Reports and none of the official law reports.  However the significance of the case was recognised by the judiciary much earlier; shortly after the decision was handed down it was extensively cited with approval by the Court of Appeal in Lipkin Gorman (a Firm) v Karpnale Ltd [1989] 1 WLR 1340 (overturned by the House of Lords on other grounds).

Facts

The main facts of the case appear in the judgment.  Barclays Bank agreed to lend £400,000 to Quincecare Ltd, a company formed specifically to purchase four chemists shops. The chairman of the company, Mr Harry Stiller, caused a sum of about £340,000 to be drawn down and to be misapplied for his dishonest purposes.  Mr Stiller was later sentenced to four years' imprisonment, but almost the entire sum was lost. The bank then sued the company as principal debtor, and its guarantor (a company called UniChem). Both the principal debtor and the guarantor defended the claim, and put forward counterclaims. The central issues related to the question whether the bank acted in breach of duty towards either the principal debtor or the guarantor.

The trial judge, Steyn J summarised the principal issue as follows:

Decision

The decision of the court was given by Steyn J.  Having identified the central issue from the outset, much of the decision was a detailed review of the evidence to consider to what extent the bank knew, or ought to have known, of the fraudulent designs of Quincecare's chairman.  This included a review of the dealings of the bank with Mr Stiller, and also consideration of expert evidence of the usual customs and practices of bankers.

Although the company and its guarantor advanced a number of different defences, all of which were addressed in the judgment, the most important aspect of the judgment in terms of jurisprudence was the decision in relation to whether or not the bank was in breach of its duty to its customer by failing to be alive to possible fraud, and the test laid down by the court to be applied.  The judgment briefly reviewed the principal authorities, being Selangor United Rubber Estates Ltd v Cradock (No 3) [1968] 1 WLR 1555 and Karak Rubber Co Ltd v Burden (No 2) [1972] 1 WLR 602, and the more recent first instance decision in Lipkin Gorman (a firm) v Karpnale Ltd [1987] 1 WLR 987 (subsequently appealed after the decision in Quincecare was handed down).

In an oft-cited passage, Steyn J held that:

He went on to stress that "trust, not distrust, is also the basis of a bank's dealings with its customers", citing with approval similar comments from Bowen LJ in Sanders Bros v Maclean & Co (1883) 11 QBD 327 at 343.

Accordingly, he dismissed the defences and counterclaims of the defendants and gave judgment for the bank in the amount of the loan, plus interest and costs.

Authority

The decision in Quincecare has been broadly accepted as authoritative ever since it was handed down.  It is recognised as authoritative by leading academic texts.

It was cited with approval almost immediately after it was decided by the Court of Appeal in Lipkin Gorman (a Firm) v Karpnale Ltd [1989] 1 WLR 1340, which is now the leading authority in this area of the law.

Despite the consternation the decision caused, since Quincecare was decided there has been only one judicial decision in the United Kingdom where a bank has been held to be liable for breaching the Quincecare duty.

Footnotes

1988 in British law
1988 in case law
English banking case law
Quincecare Ltd